Arie Zaban (born in 1961) is an Israeli professor of chemistry. He is President of Bar-Ilan University.

Biography

Arie Zaban was born in Israel. He served in the Israel Air Force as a Phantom pilot. He earned a B.Sc. in Chemistry and a Ph.D. in Electrochemistry from Bar-Ilan University. He spent two years of postdoctoral work at the United States National Renewable Energy Laboratory in Colorado.

Academic career
He returned to Bar-Ilan, becoming a professor of chemistry. He was a founding director of the Bar-Ilan’s Institute of Nanotechnology and Advanced Materials for seven years, and was elected to be Bar-Ilan's Vice President of Research in 2014. In 2017 Zaban was elected to be Bar-Ilan's eighth president, succeeding Daniel Hershkowitz.

See also
Education in Israel

References 

Bar-Ilan University alumni
Israeli chemists
Presidents of universities in Israel
Academic staff of Bar-Ilan University
21st-century Israeli educators
1961 births
Israeli Air Force personnel
Living people